Live! is an album by Billy "Crash" Craddock. It was released in 1977 on ABC/Dot Records. It was recorded at the Ivanhoe Theatre in Chicago, Illinois.

Track listing
Introduction
Promised Land
Ruby Baby
Walk Softly
Rock & Medley
Rock and Roll Music
Blueberry Hill
Your Momma Don't Dance
All I Have To Do Is Dream
Wake Up Little Suzie
Elvis Dialogue
Hound Dog
Easy as Pie
Broken Down in Tiny Pieces
Encore
Encore
Rub It In
A Tear Fell
Whole Lotta Shakin' Goin On
Blue Suede Shoes

1977 live albums
Billy "Crash" Craddock live albums